Clifton Lee Ray Jr. (born July 27, 1958) is an American serial killer, responsible for at least three murders in Kansas City, Missouri between 1987 and 1992, and is suspected in six other murders. 
Ray was convicted of murdering his neighbor in 1995, and was soon going to be eligible for parole until DNA profiling exposed his responsibility in the murders of Deborah Taylor and Joycie Flowers. In October 2007, Ray was convicted of both murders and was sentenced to life imprisonment. 

Upon the sentencing, Ray has remained in various prison facilities. As of November 2021, Ray is currently housed at the Western Missouri Correctional Center, under the ID number 511811.

See also 

List of serial killers in the United States

References 

1958 births
American serial killers
Living people
Male serial killers
People convicted of murder by Missouri
Place of birth missing (living people)
Prisoners sentenced to life imprisonment by Missouri